Events in the year 1999 in Mexico.

Incumbents

Federal government
 President: Ernesto Zedillo
 Interior Secretary (SEGOB): Francisco Labastida (until 21 May); Diódoro Carrasco (from 21 May)
 Secretary of Foreign Affairs (SRE): María del Rosario Green Macías
 Communications Secretary (SCT): Carlos Ruiz Sacristán
 Education Secretary (SEP): Miguel Limón Rojas
 Secretary of Defense (SEDENA): Enrique Cervantes Aguirre
 Secretary of Navy: José Ramón Lorenzo Franco
 Secretary of Labor and Social Welfare: José Antonio González Fernández/Mariano Palacios Alcocer 
 Secretary of Welfare: Esteban Moctezuma (until 4 August); Carlos Jarque (from 4 August)
 Secretary of Public Education: Miguel Limón Rojas
 Tourism Secretary (SECTUR): Óscar Espinosa Villarreal
 Secretary of the Environment (SEMARNAT): Julia Carabias Lillo
 Secretary of Health (SALUD): Juan Ramón de la Fuente (until 30 November); José Antonio González Fernández (from 30 November)

Supreme Court

 President of the Supreme Court: José Vicente Aguinaco Alemán then Genaro David Góngora Pimentel

Governors

 Aguascalientes: Felipe González González, (National Action Party, PAN)
 Baja California: Alejandro González Alcocer, Substitute, (PAN)
 Baja California Sur: Leonel Cota Montaño (PRD)/Guillermo Mercado Romero (PRI)
 Campeche: José Antonio González Curi
 Chiapas: Roberto Albores Guillén
 Chihuahua: Patricio Martínez García (PRI)
 Coahuila: Enrique Martínez y Martínez/Rogelio Montemayor Seguy (PRI)
 Colima: Fernando Moreno Peña (PRI)
 Durango: Ángel Sergio Guerrero Mier (PRI)
 Guanajuato: Vicente Fox/Ramon Martin Huerta (PAN)
 Guerrero: Angel Aguirre Rivero/René Juárez Cisneros (PAN)
 Hidalgo: Alberto Cárdenas Jiménez (PAN)
 Jalisco: Humberto Lugo Gil/Manuel Angel Nunez Soto (PAN)
 State of Mexico: César Camacho Quiroz/Arturo Montiel Rojas (PRI)
 Michoacán: Víctor Manuel Tinoco
 Morelos: Jorge Morales Barud (Substitute—PRI).
 Nayarit: Rigoberto Ochoa Zaragoza/Antonio Echevarría Domínguez
 Nuevo León: Fernando Canales (PRI)
 Oaxaca: Heladio Ramírez López (PRI)
 Puebla: Melquiades Morales Flores/Manuel Bartlett Díaz (PRI)
 Querétaro: Ignacio Loyola Vera (PRI)
 Quintana Roo: Mario Villanueva Madrid/Joaquín Hendricks Díaz (PRI)
 San Luis Potosí: Fernando Silva Nieto (PRI)
 Sinaloa: Juan S. Millán (PRI)
 Sonora: Armando López Nogales (PRI)
 Tabasco: Roberto Madrazo Pintado (PRI)
 Tamaulipas: Manuel Cavazos Lerma/Tomás Yarrington
 Tlaxcala: José Antonio Álvarez Lima/Alfonso Sánchez Anaya (PRI)
 Veracruz: Miguel Alemán Velasco
 Yucatán: Víctor Cervera Pacheco (PRI)
 Zacatecas: Ricardo Monreal Ávila (PRI)
Head of Government of the Federal District
Cuauhtémoc Cárdenas, Party of the Democratic Revolution (PRD), (until September 29)
Rosario Robles (PRD) (starting September 29)

Events

  The banderas monumentales program is initiated.
 January: 1999 UNAM strike 
 March 21: 1999 Mexican referendums 
 June 15: 1999 Tehuacán earthquake 
 August 18–25: Hurricane Bret 
 September 5–9: Hurricane Greg 
 September 12: Nuestra Belleza México 1999 
 September 30: 1999 Oaxaca earthquake 
 September – October: 1999 Mexico floods
 November: Mexico hosts the first Parapan American Games

Awards	

	
Belisario Domínguez Medal of Honor	– Carlos Fuentes
Order of the Aztec Eagle	
National Prize for Arts and Sciences	
National Public Administration Prize	
Ohtli Award
 Deborah V. Ortiz
 David R. Maciel

Sport

 Primera División de México Verano 1999.
 Primera División de México Invierno 1999. 
 1999 FIFA Confederations Cup Final.
 Mexico participate in the 1999 Copa América and become 3rd. 
 Homenaje a Dos Leyendas: El Santo y Salvador Lutteroth (1999). 
 Ruleta de la Muerte (1999). 
 1999 Women's NORCECA Volleyball Championship in Monterrey.

Television

Debuted

 Alma Rebelde
 Catalina y Sebastián
 Háblame de amor
 Laberintos de pasión
 Mujeres engañadas
 Nunca Te Olvidaré
 Por tu amor
 Rosalinda
 Tres mujeres
 Yacaranday

Ended

 Alma Rebelde
 Camila
 Catalina y Sebastián
 El diario de Daniela
 Nunca Te Olvidaré
 Por tu amor
 El Privilegio de Amar
 Rosalinda
 Yacaranday

Births

Deaths
 March 19: Jaime Sabines, Mexican poet (Horal, 1950) and Tarumba in Mexico City (b. 1926).
May 15: Gutierre Tibón, Italian-Mexican writer (b. 1905)
 July 22: Lauro Ortega Martínez, 89, governor of Morelos 1982-1988 (b. 1910)

See also
List of Mexican films of 1999

References

External links